The Winnebago Pool is a collective name for a group of interconnected lakes in eastern Wisconsin.  The terminal point of this watershed is Lake Winnebago itself, which has a surface elevation of 746 feet.  Besides Lake Winnebago, the Winnebago Pool includes Big Lake Butte des Morts, Lake Poygan and Lake Winneconne. After the waters reach Lake Winnebago, they exit through the Lower Fox River and over the next 39 miles, the river drops over 150 feet to reach the lower water level of Green Bay.

The primary feed waters of the Winnebago Pool are the Wolf River, Upper Fox River and Fond du Lac River. Lakes Winnebago and Big Lake Butte des Morts (along with Little Lake Butte des Morts to the northeast) served as part of the Fox-Wisconsin Waterway. The Butte des Morts region is part of the Winnebago Pool.

References

Lakes of Wisconsin